Inuktitut (syllabics ; from , 'person' + , 'like', 'in the manner of'), also known as Eastern Canadian Inuktitut, is one of the principal Inuit languages of Canada. It is spoken in all areas north of the tree line, including parts of the provinces of Newfoundland and Labrador, Quebec, to some extent in northeastern Manitoba as well as the Northwest Territories and Nunavut. It is one of the aboriginal languages written with Canadian Aboriginal syllabics.

It is recognised as an official language in Nunavut alongside Inuinnaqtun, and both languages are known collectively as Inuktut. Further, it is recognized as one of eight official native tongues in the Northwest Territories. It also has legal recognition in Nunavik—a part of Quebec—thanks in part to the James Bay and Northern Quebec Agreement, and is recognised in the Charter of the French Language as the official language of instruction for Inuit school districts there. It also has some recognition in Nunatsiavut—the Inuit area in Labrador—following the ratification of its agreement with the government of Canada and the province of Newfoundland and Labrador. The 2016 Canadian census reports that 70,540 individuals identify themselves as Inuit, of whom 37,570 self-reported Inuktitut as their mother tongue.

The term Inuktitut is sometimes used more broadly to include Inuvialuktun and thus nearly all Inuit dialects of Canada. However, Statistics Canada lists all Inuit languages in the Canadian census as Inuktut.

History

Inuktitut in the Canadian school system 
Before contact, Inuit learned skills by example and participation. The Inuktitut language provided them with all the vocabulary required to describe traditional practices and natural features. Up to this point, it was solely an oral language. Colonialism brought the European schooling system over to Canada. The missionaries of the Anglican and Roman Catholic churches were the first ones to deliver formal education to Inuit in schools. The teachers used the Inuktitut language for instruction and developed writing systems.

In 1928 the first residential school for Inuit opened, and English became the language of instruction. As the government's interests in the north increased, it started taking over the education of Inuit. After the end of World War II, English was seen as the language of communication in all domains. Officials expressed concerns about the difficulty for Inuit to find employment if they were not able to communicate in English. Inuit were supposed to use English at school, work, and even on the playground. Inuit themselves viewed Inuktitut as the way to express their feelings and be linked to their identity, while English was a tool for making money.

In the 1960s, the European attitude towards the Inuktitut language started to change. Inuktitut was seen as a language worth preserving, and it was argued that knowledge, particularly in the first years of school, is best transmitted in the mother tongue. This set off the beginning of bilingual schools. Content was now taught in Inuktitut, English, and French.

Legislation 
Inuktitut became one of the official languages in the Northwest Territories in 1984. Its status is secured in the Northwest Territories Official Language Act. With the split of the Territory into NWT and Nunavut in 1999, both territories kept the Language Act. The autonomous area Nunatsiavut in Labrador made Inuktitut the government language when it was formed in 2005. In Nunavik, the James Bay and Northern Quebec Agreement recognizes Inuktitut in the education system.

Languages and dialects

Nunavut
Nunavut's basic law lists four official languages: English, French, Inuktitut, and Inuinnaqtun. It is ambiguous in state policy to what degree Inuktitut and Inuinnaqtun can be thought of as separate languages. The words Inuktitut, or more correctly Inuktut ('Inuit language') are increasingly used to refer to both Inuinnaqtun and Inuktitut together, or "Inuit languages" in English.

Nunavut is the home of some 24,000 Inuit, over 80% of whom speak Inuktitut. This includes some 3,500 people reported as monolinguals. The 2001 census data shows that the use of Inuktitut, while lower among the young than the elderly, has stopped declining in Canada as a whole and may even be increasing in Nunavut.

The South Baffin dialect is spoken across the southern part of Baffin Island, including the territorial capital Iqaluit. This has in recent years made it a much more widely heard dialect, since a great deal of Inuktitut media originates in Iqaluit. Some linguists also distinguish an East Baffin dialect from either South Baffin or North Baffin, which is an Inuvialuk dialect.

As of the early 2000s, Nunavut has gradually implemented early childhood, elementary, and secondary school-level immersion programmes within its education system to further preserve and promote the Inuktitut language. , "Pirurvik, Iqaluit's Inuktitut language training centre, has a new goal: to train instructors from Nunavut communities to teach Inuktitut in different ways and in their own dialects when they return home."

Nunavik
Quebec is home to roughly 15,800 Inuit, nearly all of whom live in Nunavik. According to the 2021 census, 80.9% of Quebec Inuit speak Inuktitut.

The Nunavik dialect is relatively close to the South Baffin dialect, but not identical. Because of the political and physical boundary between Nunavik and Nunavut, Nunavik has separate government and educational institutions from those in the rest of the Inuktitut-speaking world, resulting in a growing standardization of the local dialect as something separate from other forms of Inuktitut. In the Nunavik dialect, Inuktitut is called .

Subdialects of Inuktitut in this region include Tarrarmiut and Itivimuit.  Itivimuit is associated with Inukjuak, Quebec, and there is an Itivimuit River near the town.

Labrador
The Nunatsiavut dialect (  or, often in government documents) was once spoken across northern Labrador. It has a distinct writing system, developed in Greenland in the 1760s by German missionaries from the Moravian Church. This separate writing tradition, the remoteness of Nunatsiavut from other Inuit communities, has made it into a distinct dialect with a separate literary tradition. The Nunatsiavummiut call their language .

Although Nunatsiavut claims over 4,000 inhabitants of Inuit descent, only 550 reported Inuktitut to be their native language in the 2001 census, mostly in the town of Nain. Inuktitut is seriously endangered in Labrador.

Nunatsiavut also had a separate dialect reputedly much closer to western Inuktitut dialects, spoken in the area around Rigolet. According to news reports, in 1999 it had only three very elderly speakers.

Greenland
Though often thought to be a dialect of Greenlandic, Inuktun or Polar Eskimo is a recent arrival in Greenland from the Eastern Canadian Arctic, arriving perhaps as late as the 18th century.

Phonology

Eastern dialects of Inuktitut have fifteen consonants and three vowels (which can be long or short). Consonants are arranged with six places of articulation: bilabial, labiodental, alveolar, palatal, velar and uvular; and three manners of articulation: voiceless stops, voiced continuants and nasals, as well as two additional sounds—voiceless fricatives. Natsalingmiutut has an additional consonant  , a vestige of the retroflex consonants of Proto-Inuit. All dialects of Inuktitut have only three basic vowels and make a phonological distinction between short and long forms of all vowels. In —Nunavut standard Roman orthography—long vowels are written as a double vowel.

All voiceless stops are unaspirated, like in many other languages. The voiceless uvular stop is usually written as q, but sometimes written as r. The voiceless lateral fricative is romanized as ɬ, but is often written as &, or simply as l.

/ŋ/ is spelt as ng, and geminated /ŋ/ is spelt as nng.

Grammar

Inuktitut, like other Eskimo–Aleut languages, has a very rich morphological system, in which a succession of different morphemes are added to root words to indicate things that, in languages like English, would require several words to express. (See also: Agglutinative language and Polysynthetic language.) All words begin with a root morpheme to which other morphemes are suffixed. Inuktitut has hundreds of distinct suffixes, in some dialects as many as 700. However, it is highly regular, with rules that do not have exceptions like in English and other Indo-European languages, though they are sometimes very complicated.

One famous example is the word  meaning 'I'll have to go to the airport':

Writing

Latin alphabets 

Moravian missionaries, with the purpose of introducing Inuit to Christianity and the Bible, contributed to the development of an Inuktitut alphabet in Greenland during the 1760s that was based on the Latin script. (This alphabet is distinguished by its inclusion of the letter kra, ĸ.) They later travelled to Labrador in the 1800s, bringing the Inuktitut alphabet with them.

The Alaskan Yupik and Inupiat (who additionally developed their own syllabary) and the Siberian Yupik also adopted Latin alphabets.

Qaniujaaqpait 
Most Inuktitut in Nunavut and Nunavik is written using a scheme called  or Inuktitut syllabics, based on Canadian Aboriginal syllabics.

In the 1860s, missionaries imported this system of Qaniujaaqpait, which they had developed in their efforts to convert the Cree to Christianity, to the Eastern Canadian Inuit. The Netsilik Inuit in Kugaaruk and north Baffin Island adopted  by the 1920s.

In September 2019, a unified orthography called Inuktut Qaliujaaqpait, based on the Latin alphabet without diacritics, was adopted for all varieties of Inuktitut by the national organization Inuit Tapiriit Kanatami, after eight years of work. It was developed by Inuit to be used by speakers of any dialect from any region, and can be typed on electronic devices without specialized keyboard layouts. It does not replace syllabics, and people from the regions are not required to stop using their familiar writing systems. Implementation plans are to be established for each region. It includes letters such as ff, ch, and rh, the sounds for which exist in some dialects but do not have standard equivalents in syllabics. It establishes a standard alphabet but not spelling or grammar rules. Long vowels are written by doubling the vowel (e.g., aa, ii, uu). The apostrophe represents a glottal stop when after a vowel (e.g.), or separates an n from an ng (e.g.) or an r from an rh (e.g.).

In April 2012, with the completion of the Old Testament, the first complete Bible in Inuktitut, translated by native speakers, was published.

The Canadian syllabary

The Inuktitut syllabary used in Canada is based on the Cree syllabary devised by the missionary James Evans. The present form of the syllabary for Canadian Inuktitut was adopted by the Inuit Cultural Institute in Canada in the 1970s. Inuit in Alaska, Inuvialuit, Inuinnaqtun speakers, and Inuit in Greenland and Labrador use Latin alphabets.

Though conventionally called a syllabary, the writing system has been classified by some observers as an abugida, since syllables starting with the same consonant have related glyphs rather than unrelated ones.

All of the characters needed for the Inuktitut syllabary are available in the Unicode block Unified Canadian Aboriginal Syllabics. The territorial government of Nunavut, Canada, has developed TrueType fonts called  (ᐱᒋᐊᕐᓂᖅ ),  (ᐅᖃᒻᒪᖅ ), and (ᐅᕓᒥᐊ ) for computer displays. They were designed by Vancouver-based Tiro Typeworks. Apple Macintosh computers include an Inuktitut IME (Input Method Editor) as part of keyboard language options. Linux distributions provide locale and language support for Inupiaq, Kalaallisut and Inuktitut.

Braille

In 2012 Tamara Kearney, Manager of Braille Research and Development at the Commonwealth Braille and Talking Book Cooperative, developed a Braille code for the Inuktitut language syllabics. This code is based on representing the syllabics' orientation. Machine translation from Unicode UTF-8 and UTF-16 can be performed using the liblouis Braille translation system which includes an Inuktitut Braille translation table. The book  (The Orphan and the Polar Bear) became the first work ever translated into Inuktitut Braille, and a copy is held by the Nunavut Territorial Library at Baker Lake, Nunavut.

See also

Indigenous Languages of the Americas
Inuit Languages
 Thule people

References

Bibliography

 
 
 
 
 
 
  , ed: Dirmid R. F. Collis.  .

Although as many of the examples as possible are novel or extracted from Inuktitut texts, some of the examples in this article are drawn from Introductory Inuktitut and Inuktitut Linguistics for Technocrats.

Further reading

 Allen, Shanley. Aspects of Argument Structure Acquisition in Inuktitut. Language acquisition & language disorders, v. 13. Philadelphia: John Benjamins Pub, 1996. 
 Balt, Peter. Inuktitut Affixes. Rankin Inlet? N.W.T.: s.n, 1978.
 Fortescue, Michael, Steven Jacobson, and Lawrence Kaplan. Comparative Eskimo Dictionary with Aleut Cognates – second edition. Fairbanks: University of Alaska Press, 2011. .
 Kalmar, Ivan. Case and Context in Inuktitut (Eskimo). Mercury series. Ottawa: National Museums of Canada, 1979.
 Nowak, Elke. Transforming the Images Ergativity and Transitivity in Inuktitut (Eskimo). Empirical approaches to language typology, 15. New York: Mouton de Gruyter, 1996. 
 Schneider, Lucien. Ulirnaisigutiit An Inuktitut–English Dictionary of Northern Québec, Labrador, and Eastern Arctic Dialects (with an English-Inuktitut Index). Québec: Les Presses de l'Université Laval, 1985.
 Spalding, Alex, and Thomas Kusugaq. Inuktitut A Multi-Dialectal Outline Dictionary (with an Aivilingmiutaq Base). Iqaluit, NT: Nunavut Arctic College, 1998. 
 Swift, Mary D. Time in Child Inuktitut A Developmental Study of an Eskimo–Aleut Language. Studies on language acquisition, 24. Berlin: M. de Gruyter, 2004. 
 Thibert, Arthur. Eskimo–English, English–Eskimo Dictionary = Inuktitut–English, English–Inuktitut Dictionary. Ottawa: Laurier Books, 1997.

External links

Dictionaries and lexica

Webpages
 A Brief History of Inuktitut Writing Culture
 Inuktitut Syllabarium (Languagegeek)
 Our Language, Our Selves 
 Government of Nunavut font download
 Inuktitut-friendly website hosting and development
 Tusaalanga ("Let me hear it"), a website with Inuktitut online lessons with sound files

Utilities
 NANIVARA – Inuktitut Search Engine. – NANIVARA means "I've found it!" in Inuktitut.

 
Agglutinative languages
Inuit languages
Indigenous languages of the North American Arctic
First Nations languages in Canada
Indigenous languages of the United States